Bought for a Dollar, Sold for a Dime is the sixth album by Little Axe, released on June 7, 2010 by Real World Records. The album was originally issued as in demo form as digital download in May 2008.

Track listing

Personnel 

Musicians
The Crispy Horns – brass
Richard Doswell – saxophone
Bernard Fowler – vocals (2-4, 8, 10, 13)
Dave Fullwood – trumpet
Alan Glen – harmonica
Keith LeBlanc – drums (2, 4, 6-8, 11)
Skip McDonald – guitar, producer, vocals (2, 7, 9, 11, 12, 14)
Chris Petter – trombone
Doug Wimbish – bass guitar
Additional musicians
Cyril Atef – drums (6)
Sas Bell – vocals (1, 11, 14)
Ken Boothe – vocals (6)
Madeline Edgehill – vocals (11)
Kevin Gibbs – vocals (1, 11, 14)
Hugh Marsh – violin (12)
Andy Pask – bass guitar (12)
Valerie Skeete – vocals (11)
Daby Touré – vocals (12)

Technical personnel
Marco Migliari – engineering
Adrian Sherwood – producer

Release history

References

External links 
 

2010 albums
Albums produced by Adrian Sherwood
Little Axe albums